The Académie Belgo-Espagnole d'Histoire (Academia Belgo Española de Historia) is a cultural society founded in Brussels in 1953. The Academy was formed by the noted historian and academic scholar Fortune Koller. Koller is known for his work in the fields of heraldry, genealogy and  chivalric & dynastic orders. The purpose of the Academy is to research and publish works on various historical periods of Hispanic culture.  The society has also held numerous historical exhibitions.

Members
The society is composed of renowned Belgium and Spanish historians as well as other internationally known scholars. Since its founding, the Academy has held its meetings at the headquarters of the Archives Generales du Royaume de Belgique, and occasionally at the residence of the President.

Membership
Membership requires the nomination of three academicians and consent of the nomination board. There are three classes of membership. Membership is limited in all three categories.

 Señores Academicos de Honor (10 members)
 Señores Academicos de Numero (60 members)
 Señores Academicos Correspondientes (39 members)

Noted Academicians

 Manuel Fraga Iribarne
 Francisco de Borbón y Escasany, Duque de Sevilla, Grande de Espana
 Joaquim Veríssimo Serrão
 Jesús Posada Moreno
 Armand de Decker
 Juan Van Halen y Acedo, Barón de Perwez
 Roberto Soravilla y Fernandez
 Jesús Sancho Rof
 Carlos Murciano González-Arias de Reyna
 Manuel Rodríguez de Maribona y Dávila, Conde de Alba (Two Sicilies)
 Bernardo de Ungría y Goiburu, Marques de Montefalcón
 Enrique Fernandez-Miranda y Lozana, Duque de Fernandez-Miranda, Grande de Espana
 Alfonso de Ceballos-Escalera y Gila, Marqués de la Floresta
 Gonzalo Martínez Diez
 Odón Betanzos Palacios
 Medardo Fraile
 António de Sousa Lara, Conde de Guedes
 Peter Spufford
 María José Martínez de la Fuente
 José María de Montells y Galán
 Otto F. von Feigenblatt

Presidents

 Fortune Koller (1953-1979)
 Robert Wellens (1979)
 Pierre Houart (1979-1991)
 Excmo. Senor Don Manuel Fraga Iribarne (1991)
 Excmo. Senor Don Luis Cervera Vera (1991-1999)
 Excmo. Senor Alfonso de Ceballos-Escalera y Gila, Marques de la Floresta (2001-  )

Publications
During the years of the presidency of its founder, general sessions were held and 175 publications were printed on diverse historical topics. Some publications include:
 Les archives de Simancas
 Les Belges admis dans les divers Ordres étranger
 Les Archers du Roy d' Espagne
 Le Belges envoyes au Yucatán
 La "domination espagnole"
 Siècles d' or et de lumiere
 Les Espagnols dans les Conseils collatéraux entre 1579 et 1609
 Les sépultures des Princes des Pays d' En-Bas
 Het Gulden Vlies en zijn deelname in de kollaterale raden van 1579 tot 1609
 Les officiers de la Toison d' Or
  La politique europeenne de Philippe Ier le Beau

References

Spanish Heraldry

Academies of arts
Organizations established in 1953